Kartik is the seventh month in the Vikram Samvat, the official Calendar for Nepalese. This month usually starts on 18 October until 16 November. This month is mostly 30 days long.
Kartik is also known as the month of festivals because two major festivals, Dashain and Tihar, usually falls in this month.

Months in the Nepali calendar

See also 
 Vikram Samvat
 Kartik (month)

Nepali calendar